The women's 4×100 metre freestyle relay was a swimming event held as part of the swimming at the 1924 Summer Olympics programme. It was the third appearance of the event, which had been established in 1912. The competition was held on Friday 18 July 1924.

Records
These were the standing world and Olympic records (in minutes) prior to the 1924 Summer Olympics.

The United States set a new world record and broke the five-minute barrier with 4:58.8 minutes.

Results

Final

References

External links
Olympic Report
 

Swimming at the 1924 Summer Olympics
1924 in women's swimming
Women's events at the 1924 Summer Olympics